Marko Simić (born 16 June 1987) is a professional football defender playing for Budućnost Podgorica. Born in Serbia, he represents the Montenegro national football team.

Born in Obrenovac, SR Serbia, SFR Yugoslavia (now Serbia), Marko Simić initially played in the youth categories of FK Partizan. Simić was a part of one of the best generations of BATE Borisov which made the group stages of the UEFA Champions League in 2011 and 2012. He made his debut for the Montenegro national team in 2013.

Club career

Spartak Varna
In January 2007 Simić joined Bulgarian A PFG side Spartak Varna. He made his team début on 3 February in a 3–1 friendly win over Svetkavitsa, but he never played in competitive match for Spartak. One months later Simić joined North-East V AFG club Chernomorets Byala on loan and earned 6 appearances to the end of the season.

Journeyman years
In summer of 2007 he signed with Serbian League West side FK Radnički Kragujevac. After a loan spell with OFK Mladenovac during the second half of the season, he moved to Hungary to play with Budapest Honvéd FC in the Hungarian Championship. In summer 2009 he was back to Serbia to play with Serbian First League (second tier) club FK Bežanija. The following summer he moved to FK Jagodina playing in the Serbian SuperLiga where he made 12 league appearances scoring one goal during the first half of the 2010–11 season.

BATE Borisov
During the winter break he moved to FC BATE Borisov in the Belarusian Premier League. He has established himself as a starter for the team. Simić featured in BATE's lineups in the UEFA Champions League in 2011 and 2012, featuring against Barcelona, Milan, and Bayern Munich.

Kayserispor
In the winter 2013 transfer window, Simić moved to Kayserispor, whose coach at the time, Robert Prosinečki, was instrumental in bringing Simić to the club.

Rostov
On 14 March 2017, he signed a short-term deal with the Russian Premier League side FC Rostov until the end of the 2016–17 season after Rostov's first-choice defender Vladimir Granat suffered a season-ending injury.

International career
On 29 September 2011, he received his first ever call for the Serbian national team for the upcoming UEFA Euro 2012 qualifying matches against Italy and Slovenia on 7 and 11 October, but did not debut.

Later, he received a call for the Montenegro national football team and debuted in a friendly match played against Belarus on 14 August 2013. As of 15 October 2020, he has earned a total of 43 caps, scoring 1 goal.

International goals
Scores and results list Montenegro's goal tally first.

References

External links
 

1987 births
Living people
People from Obrenovac
Association football central defenders
Serbian footballers
Montenegrin footballers
Montenegro international footballers
PFC Spartak Varna players
FK Radnički 1923 players
OFK Mladenovac players
Budapest Honvéd FC players
FK Bežanija players
FK Jagodina players
FC BATE Borisov players
Kayserispor footballers
Hapoel Tel Aviv F.C. players
FC Rostov players
Pakhtakor Tashkent FK players
FK Liepāja players
FK Budućnost Podgorica players
Serbian First League players
Nemzeti Bajnokság I players
Serbian SuperLiga players
Belarusian Premier League players
Süper Lig players
TFF First League players
Israeli Premier League players
Russian Premier League players
Uzbekistan Super League players
Latvian Higher League players
Montenegrin expatriate footballers
Expatriate footballers in Bulgaria
Montenegrin expatriate sportspeople in Bulgaria
Expatriate footballers in Hungary
Montenegrin expatriate sportspeople in Hungary
Expatriate footballers in Belarus
Montenegrin expatriate sportspeople in Belarus
Expatriate footballers in Turkey
Montenegrin expatriate sportspeople in Turkey
Expatriate footballers in Israel
Montenegrin expatriate sportspeople in Israel
Expatriate footballers in Russia
Montenegrin expatriate sportspeople in Russia
Expatriate footballers in Uzbekistan
Montenegrin expatriate sportspeople in Uzbekistan
Expatriate footballers in Latvia
Montenegrin expatriate sportspeople in Latvia